Austroblechnum lehmannii is a species of fern in the family Blechnaceae. It is native to Mexico (Southeast Mexico and Southwest Mexico), Central America (Costa Rica, El Salvador, Guatemala, Nicaragua and Panama), South America (Bolivia, South Brazil, Southeast Brazil, Colombia, mainland Ecuador, Guyana, Peru and Venezuela) and the Galápagos Islands.

The Checklist of Ferns and Lycophytes of the World regards Blechnum petiolare as a possible synonym; other sources treat it as a separate species.

References

Blechnaceae
Flora of Southeastern Mexico
Flora of Southwestern Mexico
Flora of Costa Rica
Flora of El Salvador
Flora of Guatemala
Flora of Nicaragua
Flora of Panama
Flora of Bolivia
Flora of South Brazil
Flora of Southeast Brazil
Flora of Colombia
Flora of Ecuador
Flora of Guyana
Flora of Peru
Flora of Venezuela
Flora of the Galápagos Islands